Jack McConaghy (December 21, 1902 – October 13, 1977) was an American set decorator. He was nominated for two Academy Awards in the category Best Art Direction.

Selected filmography
McConaghy was nominated for two Academy Awards for Best Art Direction:

 The Desert Song (1943)
 San Antonio (1945)

References

External links

American set decorators
American art directors
1902 births
1977 deaths